South Harrisburg (or South Side) is a neighborhood located in Harrisburg, Pennsylvania. Its southern border is Steelton, Pennsylvania; the eastern border is the Capital Area Greenbelt; its northern border Interstate 83; its western border the Susquehanna River. South Harrisburg consists of a mix of industrial areas on its outskirts with several housing developments located centrally and eastern, with auto-centric commercial areas in the north. PennDOT's state headquarters building for Driver & Vehicle Services is also located within South Harrisburg along the river. Notably, the area also contains the city's long contested Harrisburg Incinerator located off of Cameron Street, which introduces environmental justice concerns for nearby residents, many of whom fall into low- and moderate-income (LMI) categories. There are, however, large amounts of undeveloped green spaces and access to parks and trails, particularly the Capital Area Greenbelt.

See also
 List of Harrisburg neighborhoods

References

Neighborhoods in Harrisburg, Pennsylvania